USCGC Gasconade is a Gasconade-class  river buoy tender which was built in 1964 at Saint Louis, Missouri where she was initially homeported. In 1965 she was assigned a homeport of Omaha, Nebraska. In 2021, she had a homeport switch back to St. Louis.

Design
Gasconade pushes a specific-use  aid to navigation maintenance barge, with a crane and buoy service gear. The vessel has a  beam,  of draft, and displaces 141 tons (full load). She is powered by two diesel engines turning two shafts with 600 bhp, giving the vessel a capability of eight knots.

History
Gasconade was initially assigned a homeport at St. Louis, Missouri in 1964 but was transferred to Florence, Nebraska on 27 July 1965. On 27 September 1965, Gasconade transferred her homeport to the Corps of Engineers facility on John J. Pershing Road in Omaha, Nebraska. In the Autumn of 2021, she transferred her homeport once again, back to St. Louis. Gasconade is commanded by a master chief boatswain's mate with a crew of thirteen assigned. Her area of operation includes the Missouri River from Glasgow, Missouri to Sioux City, Iowa.

Citations

Bibliography

External links
  World navies of Today specifications for Gasconade-class tug-type river buoy tenders

Gasconade-class buoy tenders
Ships of the United States Coast Guard
1964 ships
Ships built in St. Louis